The Opus 3 is an analog 49 key  synthesizer, and designed by Herbert A. Deutsch from Hofstra University. He also wrote the manual for the synthesizer.  It was released in 1980 by Moog. The sounds are in three categories, strings, brass and organ sounds, all having their own filter apart from the organ section.

Outputs
The Opus 3 features stereo outputs and can be programmed to use the panning effect.

Notable sounds
The Opus 3 is mainly known for its electronic organ sounds, it also produces strings, brass sounds.

Notable users
 Stereolab
 Kraftwerk
 Zonetech
 808 State
 The Rentals
 Charly García – Serú Girán (1980) – Bicicleta (album) – Peperina (album) (1981)
 Charly García – Pubis Angelical (1982) – Yendo de la cama al living (1982)
 Ministry (band) - Same Old Madness (1982)

See also
 List of Moog synthesizer players
 Moog Music
 Moog synthesizer
 Robert Moog

Notes

External links 

Moog synthesizers
Monophonic synthesizers
Analog synthesizers